The 1959 Wake Forest Demon Deacons football team was an American football team that represented Wake Forest University during the 1959 NCAA University Division football season. In their fourth season under head coach Paul Amen, the Demon Deacons compiled a 6–4 record and finished in a tie for fourth place in the Atlantic Coast Conference.

Quarterback Norm Snead and end Pete Manning were selected by the Associated Press and United Press International as first-team players on the 1959 All-Atlantic Coast Conference football team. Snead later played 16 seasons in the NFL and was a four-time All-Pro selection. Guard Nick Patella was selected to the All-ACC team by the UPI.

Schedule

Team leaders

References

Wake Forest
Wake Forest Demon Deacons football seasons
Wake Forest Demon Deacons football